Bharadwaj Dayala from the city of Visakhapatnam, Andhra Pradesh, India is the first Indian to complete a solo tour around the world on an Indian-made  Karizma motorcycle. Youngest son of Rama Rao Dayala and Kusuma achieved this feat without any sponsors or support.

Route

Dayala started his world tour on motorcycle from Visakhapatnam, Andhra Pradesh, India on 2 April 2006 flagged off by the then Chief Minister of Andhra Pradesh, Dr. Y.S. Rajashekara Reddy. He then flew from Mumbai along with his bike to Tehran, Iran. From Tehran he started riding on international roads on his motorcycle traveling through Iran, Turkey, Syria, Jordan, Egypt, Greece, Italy, France, United Kingdom, Canada, the US, Australia, Indonesia and Bangladesh. After riding across 5 continents, 14 countries and 47,000 km in 18 months, he reached home on 2 October 2007.

Awards

On 4 December 2013, Dayala was felicitated by Prince of Dubai Sheikh Mansoor bin Mohammed bin Rashid Al Makhtom for his "exceptional achievement" in global travels and for his "enduring commitment to promoting goodwill, friendship and cultural understanding around the world."

Social Activities
All India Road Safety Ride:

In 2004 Dayala traveled all over World campaigning for the Road Safety creating awareness among the young riders about the importance of the road rules.

Vande Maataram

On 15 March 2014 Dayala initiated and lead the biker movement called Vande Maataram. A large group of riders traveled to all 29 states of India meeting and motivating the youth to participate in the General Elections that were conducted during April/May 2014. This energized the youth and many participated in voting for the first time.

References

External links

Living people
1969 births
Sportspeople from Visakhapatnam
Long-distance motorcycle riders